The fourth season of the television comedy series The Middle began airing on September 26, 2012 on ABC in the United States. It is produced by Blackie and Blondie Productions and Warner Bros. Television with series creators DeAnn Heline and Eileen Heisler as executive producers.

The show features Frances "Frankie" Heck (Patricia Heaton), a working-class, Midwestern woman married to Mike Heck (Neil Flynn) who resides in the small fictional town of Orson, Indiana. They are the parents of three children, Axl (Charlie McDermott), Sue (Eden Sher), and Brick (Atticus Shaffer).

Cast

Main cast
 Patricia Heaton as Frankie Heck
 Neil Flynn as Mike Heck
 Charlie McDermott as Axl Heck
 Eden Sher as Sue Heck
 Atticus Shaffer as Brick Heck

Recurring cast
 Chris Kattan as Bob, Frankie's best friend at work
 Jack McBrayer as Dr. Ted Goodwin, Frankie's over friendly boss who is oblivious to sarcasm
 Brian Doyle-Murray as Don Ehlert, Frankie's boss who fires her in early Season 4 due to her being hired last
 Brock Ciarlelli as Brad, Sue's ex-boyfriend
 Jen Ray as Nancy Donahue, Frankie's neighbor and friend
 Blaine Saunders as Carly, Sue's best friend
 Galadriel Stineman as Cassidy Finch, Axl's girlfriend
 French Stewart as Principal Cameron
 John Gammon as Darrin, Axl's friend and Sue's ex and later boyfriend

Guest cast
 Bailey Buntain as Jenna Taylor, Sue's school new freshman. She appears in "The Second Act" and "From Orson With Love".
 Dave Foley as Dr. Chuck Fulton, Brick's school therapist. He appears in "Bunny Therapy"  "Life Skills" and "The Ditch".
 Brooke Shields as Rita Glossner, the Hecks' uncouth and troubled neighbor. She appears in "The Hose".
 Jane Kaczmarek as Mrs. Sandy Armwood, Frankie's dental teacher. She appears in "The Safe" and "Wheel of Pain".
 Marsha Mason as Pat Spence, Frankie's mother. She appears in "Thanksgiving IV" and "Dollar Days".
 Jerry Van Dyke as Tag Spence, Frankie's father. He appears in "Thanksgiving IV" and "From Orson with Love".
 Casey Sander as Jack Tracy, a football scout who interviews Axl. He appears in "Thanksgiving IV".
 Norm Macdonald as Rusty Heck, Mike's brother. He appears in "Christmas Help".
 John Cullum as Big Mike, Mike's father. He appears in "Twenty Years".
 David Koechner as Jeff Webber, Frankie and Mike's new neighbor. He appears in "The Friend".
 Gabrielle Carteris as Colleen Webber, Frankie and Mike's new neighbor. She appears in "The Friend".
 Roger Rees as Mr. Glover, Sue's teacher. He appears in "The Smile".
 Molly Shannon as Janet, Frankie's sister. She appears in "The Name".
 Ryan Rottman as Cliff, Cassidy's Ex-Boyfriend. He appears in "The Name".
 Marion Ross as Mrs. Dunlap, Brick's school vice principal. She appears in "The Graduation".

Episodes

Ratings

References

The Middle (TV series)
2012 American television seasons
2013 American television seasons